Mathieu Guidere is a full professor at the University of Paris and research director at the French National Institute of Health (INSERM). A scholar of Linguistics and Translation studies, he has held other professorships at prestigious institutions including the University of Geneva, Switzerland (2007 to 2011). Dr. Guidere is also the founder of the Swiss Non-governmental organization (NGO) Multilingual International Mediators (MIM), and has been awarded a Fulbright Prize to advance his research on the psychology of terrorism. He has been also editor-in-chief of the French Journal of Languages' Professors, Les Langues Modernes. In 2015, he was also Team Leader of the European Union CVE Program in the Sub-Saharan Region. In 2017, he was also the UNOWAS Senior Expert in West Africa and the Sahel Region for countering violent extremism.

Dr. Guidere has published over 40 books on the Arab countries and on the Islmic World in French, and many of his books are translated into Arabic and English, among other languages : Italian, Spanish, Portuguese, Japanese, etc.

During the 1990s, Mathieu Guidère worked on issues surrounding global communications and propaganda from and to the Arabic language. Afterwards, he published several works including Advertising and Translation (Publicité et traduction, L'Harmattan, 2000), The Multilingual Communication: Market and Institutional Translation (La communication multilingue : Traduction commerciale et institutionnelle], De Boeck, 2008), and Iraq in Translation: The Art of Losing a War without Knowing the Language of your Opponent (Irak in translation : De l'art de perdre une guerre sans connaître la langue de son adversaire, Jacob-Duvernet, 2008).

Education
Mathieu Guidere's interest in studying the Arab world began while he was a child as he spent his first 18 years in various countries throughout Africa and the Middle East. There, he received both a French, English and Arabic education. Upon arriving to Paris, he began his advanced studies at the Sorbonne University. There, he studied French literature and Middle Eastern cultures at Bachelor then the Master's level. During this time, he joined the French Higher School of Interpreters and Translators Ecole supérieure de cadres interprètes traducteurs and graduated from there in 1995. Then, in 1997, he received the agrégation degree in Arabic language and culture before obtaining his doctoral degree in linguistics a year later, and while preparing a second doctorate in medieval Islamic history from Paris-Sorbonne University.

Career
After his agrégation degree (1997), Dr. Guidere became an associate professor (Maître de Conférences) at the University of Lyon in France, where he taught linguistics and translation from 1998 to 2003. After September 11, 2001, the French government made use of his knowledge and Dr. Guidere was appointed resident professor by the French Military Academy of Saint-Cyr in 2003. While at this position (which lasted until 2007), he was also the director of the Strategic Information Analysis Laboratory (LAISVT) in the academy's research center (CREC Saint-Cyr).

In 2007, Dr. Guidere joined the University of Geneva (Switzerland), where he was a full professor of Translation Studies and Multilingual Monitoring. He was also Director of the French Department, and Chair of the Research Group on Translation and Interpretation (GRETI, Geneva).

He is the founder of Predictive Linguistics, an emerging discipline that studies the interrelation between linguistic markers and action considered as an intentional, purposive, conscious and subjectively meaningful activity. In 2015, he published a book in French that summarizes his work on predictive linguistics and violent extremism: "La Linguistique predictive: de la cognition à l’action". The field had attracted the attention of many researchers and started to grow. He has been keynote speaker at many international conferences and symposiums.

In his recent books, he studies the relation between language and violence on the internet and social media. He demonstrates the impact of language on mental health, and explains the cultural factors of language use in the medical field. He argues also that predicting mental states through automatic discourse analysis derives from linguistic markers that reflect psychology and education.

Selected works
 Historical Dictionary of Islamic Fundamentalism (Rowman & Littlefield, 1st Edition 2012, 2nd Edition 2017).
 La Guerre des Islamismes (Editions Gallimard, 2017).
 Le Retour du Califat (Editions Gallimard, 2016).
 Atlas du terrorisme islamiste (Éditions Autrement, 2017).
 Terreur: la nouvelle ère (Editions Autrement, 2015).
 La Traduction médicale à l'heure de la pandémie (Editions L'Harmattan, 2020).
 La traductologie arabe : théorie, pratique, enseignement (Editions L'Harmattan, 2017).
 La Linguistique prédictive: de la cognition à l'action (Editions L'Harmattan, 2015).
 Psychotraumatologie : les mots du trauma (avec Pr. Louis Jehel, Éditions Lavoisier, 2022).
 Médiascopie du vocabulaire arabe (Éditions Ellipses).
 Traduire la presse arabe (Éditions Ellipses).
 Traduire la littérature arabe (Éditions Ellipses).
 Grand Imagier, petits ateliers (Éditions Ellipses).
 Adab : l'essentiel de la culture arabe (Éditions Ellipses).
 Dictionnaire culturel et historique de l'arabe (Éditions Ellipses).
 Etat du monde arabe (Éditions De Boeck, 2015).
 Sexe et charia (Éditions du Rocher, 2014).
 Le Printemps islamiste: démocratie et charia (Éditions Ellipses, 2012).
 Atlas des pays arabes (Éditions Autrement, 2012).
 Le Choc des révolutions arabes (Éditions Autrement, 2011; nouvelle édition 2012).
 Les Nouveaux terroristes (Éditions Autrement, 2010).
 Obama inchallah (Éditions Le Manuscrit, 2009).
 Al-Qaida à la conquête du Maghreb (Éditions du Rocher, 2007).
 Le Manuel de recrutement d'Al-Qaida (Éditions du Seuil, 2006).
 Riche comme un oignon (Editions Ellipses, 2008).
 Introduction à la traductologie (Éditions De Boeck, 2008)
 La communication multilingue (Éditions De Boeck, 2008)
 Irak in Translation ou De l'art de perdre une guerre sans connaître la langue de son adversaire (Éditions Jacob-Duvernet, 2008).
 Les Martyrs d'Al-Qaida (Éditions du Temps, 2005).
 La traduction arabe (Editions Ellipses, 2005).
 La poésie arabe classique (Éditions Ellipses, 2005).
 Dictionnaire multilingue de la Défense (Éditions Ellipses, 2004).
 Méthodologie de la recherche (Éditions Ellipses, 2004).
 Kalimât: le vocabulaire arabe (Éditions Ellipses, 2003).
 Manuel de traduction français-arabe (Éditions Ellipses, 2002).
 Lexique bilingue de l'arabe d'aujourd'hui (Éditions du Temps, 2001).
 Publicité et traduction (Editions L'Harmattan, 2000).

References

External links

Academic staff of the University of Geneva
University of Paris alumni
French cognitive scientists
Academic staff of the University of Paris
Living people
Year of birth missing (living people)